The New Zealand Amateur is the national amateur golf championship of New Zealand. It has been played annually since 1893, except for the war years, and is organised by New Zealand Golf.

Currently the event is played over five days and consists of a 36-hole stroke-play qualifying stage after which the leading 32 play five rounds of match-play. The final is over 36 holes.

History
The first tournament was organised by Otago Golf Club "open to members of any recognised Now Zealand club" held on 30 November and 1 and 2 December 1893, "for the amateur championship of the colony." 16 players entered, primarily from the home club. Two rounds were played on the first day, with the semi-finals on the second morning. The final was played on the third morning between two members of the Otago club, James Somerville and Henry Rose. Somerville won the first four holes but Rose won the next three. Somerville then won five of the next seven to win 6&4. Somerville had only recently arrived in New Zealand, having graduated from Edinburgh University in 1891.

The first championship meeting was held at Christchurch Golf Club in July 1894, with the amateur championship being the main event. The championship was played from 24 to 26 July with two rounds on each of the first two days and the final on the third afternoon. The final was between Hugh MacNeil and James Scott, both from the Otago club, and resulted in an easy win for MacNeil by a score of 7&6.

The 1895 championship meeting was held in the North Island for the first time, at Hutt Golf Club near Wellington, although there were suggestions that it should be played at the newly-opened Wellington Golf Club at Miramar. Until World War I, the venue generally alternated between the north and south islands.

In 1900, Arthur Duncan became the first multiple winner, having also won in 1899. He beat Hugh MacNeil, also a previous winner, in the final. In 1901, Duncan won for the third successive year, winning the final by a score of 9 & 7, the first final to be played over 36 holes. Duncan won again in 1905, while Spencer Gollan became the second multiple winner in 1906, having previously won in 1902. The inaugural New Zealand Open was played in 1907 and the 36-hole event was won by Arthur Duncan who won his fifth Amateur Championship a few days later.

Up to 1907 the event was a pure match-play event. However, with the expansion of the New Zealand Open to 72 holes and the increasing number of entries, a change was made in 1908. The final two rounds of the Open acted as qualifying rounds for the Amateur Championship, after which the leading 32 players played 5 rounds of match-play.

in the period before World War I, Arthur Duncan continued his success in the event, winning in 1909, 1911 and 1914, and he remained undefeated in the final, having won all 8 of those he had reached. He won by a record margin of 11 & 10 in 1911 and repeated the feat in 1914. The other successful player in this period was Bernard Wood who was runner-up in 1910 and then won twice in succession, 1912 and 1913.

Up to 1963, the amateur championship continued as part of the championship meeting, with the New Zealand Open acting as the qualifying event. However, from 1964 the amateur championship, open champion and New Zealand PGA Championship were separated. From 1964, the amateur championship had it own 36-hole qualification stage, the winner receiving the St Andrews Salver. From 1983 until 2011 the qualification was extended to 72 holes and became the New Zealand Stroke Play Championship. From 2012 the New Zealand Stroke Play Championship was run as a separate 72-hole event, while the amateur championship returned to having a 36-hole qualification stage.

Winners

Early finals were over 18 holes but all finals since 1901 have been over 36 holes.

Source:

References

Golf tournaments in New Zealand
Amateur golf tournaments
Recurring sporting events established in 1893
1893 establishments in New Zealand